Dauntae Mariner (born 25 January 2000) is a Samoan footballer who plays as a forward for Logan Lightning of the NPL Queensland.

Club career

Youth
Mariner began playing football at age six. As a youth he played for Mounties Wanderers FC and Macarthur Rams FC. He and his family moved from Sydney to Brisbane to play for Brisbane Strikers in 2013. After three years at the club, he went on trial with Blackburn Rovers of the English Championship. In May 2016 it was announced that he would join the club on a two-year deal. Mariner was originally spotted by Blackburn as he toured England with an Australian schoolboy team. He was also invited to trials by Middlesbrough and Wolverhampton Wanderers.

In February 2018 Mariner was announced as one of several players signed to FC Vizela of the Portuguese Campeonato, the second tier of football in the country. The following year he returned to Australia and joined the under-19 side of the A-League's Brisbane Roar. On matchday nineteen he scored a hat-trick against Sunshine Coast in his first match of the season with the club. Following the season he moved to the academy of fellow A-League club Western Sydney Wanderers.

Senior
In the 2021 FFA Cup, Mariner scored a goal for Gold Coast Knights less than a minute after entering the match to defeat Edge Hill United and progress to the Round of 16. For the 2022 season he moved to Logan Lightning FC of the same league.

International career 
Born in Australia, Mariner is of Samoan heritage. He visited Samoa for the first time in January 2017 to trial for the Samoa U17 national team that would compete in the 2017 OFC U-17 Championship. Later that month he was named to Samoa's final squad.

Personal life
Mariner is the nephew of Tim Cahill and the cousin of Kyah Cahill.

References

External links
 
 
 National Premier Leagues profile

2000 births
Living people
Australian soccer players
Samoan footballers
Association football forwards
Australian sportspeople of Samoan descent